Kilmarnock Storm  are a Scottish ice hockey team that play in the Scottish National League. They play their games at Galleon Centre in Kilmarnock. 
They won the Scottish National League during the 2008–09 season.

External links
 Kilmarnock Storm official site

References
 Kilmarnock Storm on Eurohockey.net

Ice hockey teams in Scotland
Sport in Kilmarnock
Ice hockey clubs established in 2008
2008 establishments in Scotland